Cytora is a genus of very small air-breathing land snails, terrestrial pulmonate gastropod molluscs in the family Pupinidae. This genus is endemic to New Zealand.

Description 
The height of the shell is less than 7 mm.

Species
There are 42 species in the genus Cytora. However, 23 of them were first described in 2007.

Species in the genus Cytora include:
 Cytora ampla (Powell, 1941)
 Cytora annectens (Powell, 1948)
 Cytora aranea (Powell, 1928)
 Cytora calva (Hutton, 1882)
 Cytora chiltoni (Suter, 1896)
 Cytora cytora (Gray, 1850)
 Cytora depressa Gardner, 1968
 Cytora fasciata (Suter, 1894)
 Cytora filicosta (Powell, 1948)
 Cytora hedleyi (Suter, 1894)
 Cytora hirsutissima (Powell, 1951)
 Cytora hispida Gardner, 1967
 Cytora kiama Climo, 1973
 Cytora lignaria (Pfeiffer, 1857)
 Cytora pallida (Hutton, 1883)
 Cytora pannosa (Hutton, 1882)
 Cytora septentrionale (Suter, 1907)
 Cytora solitaria (Powell, 1935)
 Cytora tekakiensis Gardner, 1967
 Cytora torquilla (Suter, 1894)

References

Pupinidae
Taxonomy articles created by Polbot